A fire control tower is a structure located near the coastline, used to detect and locate enemy vessels offshore, direct fire upon them from coastal batteries, or adjust the aim of guns by spotting shell splashes. Fire control towers came into general use in coastal defence systems in the late 19th century, as rapid development significantly increased the range of both naval guns and coastal artillery. This made fire control more complex. These towers were used in a number of countries' coastal defence systems through 1945, much later in a few cases such as Sweden. The Atlantic Wall in German-occupied Europe during World War II included fire control towers.

The U.S. Coast Artillery fire control system included many fire control towers. These were introduced in the U.S. with the Endicott Program, and were used between about 1900 and the end of WWII.

A typical fire control tower

A fire control tower usually contained several fire control stations, known variously as observation posts (OPs), base end stations, or spotting stations from which observers searched for enemy ships, fed data on target location to a plotting room, or spotted the fall of fire from their battery, so the aim of the guns could be adjusted. For example, the fire control tower at Site 131-1A contained one OP, two base end stations, and two spotting stations. A shorthand notation was used to identify the stations.

For instance, the top story of Site 131-1A was planned to contain base end station #3 and spotting station #3 for Battery #15. The overall plan document for the harbor defenses contained a list that linked the tactical numbers of all batteries to their names. That document also contained an organization chart that identified all the Command (C) and Group (G) codes, like "G3."

These towers were arrayed in networks along the coast on either side of the artillery batteries they supported. The number and height of the towers was determined by the range of the guns involved. Many fire control towers were also part of a harbor's antiaircraft warning system. Spotters occupied cramped "crow's nests" on the top floors of the towers that enabled them to lift a trapdoor in the tower's roof and scan the sky for approaching aircraft.

When an enemy surface craft was detected, bearings to it were measured from a pair of towers, using instruments like azimuth scopes or depression position finders. Since the distances along the line between the towers (called a baseline) had already been precisely measured by surveyors, the length of this baseline, plus the two bearing angles from two stations at the ends of the line (also called base end stations) to the target, could be used to plot the position of the target by a mathematical process called triangulation.

A fire control tower was usually five to ten stories tall, depending on the height of the site at which it was built and the area it had to cover. Often made of poured concrete, its lower floors were usually unoccupied and were capped by occupied observation levels. Staircases ran up to the lowest observation level, and wooden ladders were then used to climb to higher levels. But some fire control structures built atop coastal hills or bluffs only needed to be one- or two-story buildings, and were built of wood or brick. Sometimes these buildings were camouflaged as private homes, and were referred to as fire control "cottages."

The center of octagonal concrete mounting pad on the eight floor of 131-1A (which was meant to support a depression position finder) was usually the surveyed point at the end of the baseline (and thus the precise location of the base end station). A survey marker embedded in the tower's roof directly above this pad defined this point. Other observing instruments on lower floors of the tower were usually lined up directly beneath the eighth floor mounting pad and the rooftop marker, so they shared the same latitude and longitude. The pipe stands shown on floors six and seven of the Nahant Site 131-1A tower probably held azimuth scopes, which were less complex telescopes that determined bearings to a target but not its range from the tower.

Site 131-1A had electric lights, phones, and radio communications, and a time interval bell that was used for coordinating fire control information. Some fire control towers were also the mounting points for coast surveillance or fire control radar antennas. Although our sample tower has a simple, square appearance, some versions of these towers in New England had round or partly octagonal plans.

A network of fire control structures

Each major battery of Coast Artillery guns was supported by a network of fire control structures (towers, cottages, or buildings) which were spread out along the nearby coast. Guns of longer range had larger numbers of fire control stations in their networks. Depending on where the target ship was located and upon other tactical conditions, one or more of these stations would be selected to control the fire from a given battery on that target.

For a WW2-era example, take Battery Murphy, the two  guns in Nahant, MA. Murphy used ten fire control stations that made up Battery Murphy's fire control network, which was spread out over about forty miles of coastline running from Station 1 (Fourth Cliff) in the south to Station 10 (Castle Hill) in the north. Half of these stations were located in tall towers, and half in low-rise cottages.

The length of the baselines running between each pair of stations was known very precisely. These distances were plugged into the triangulation equations for the pair of stations involved in sighting on a particular target in order to compute its position. As the target ship moved along the coast, different pairs of fire control stations (and therefore different baselines) would come into play. Very precise measurements were also taken of the distance between the directing point of each battery (often the pintle center of its Gun #1) and each fire control station's observing point. These distance could also be used for target location, if one of the observations was taken from the battery itself and another from the distant station.

Gallery

Footnotes

References

 
 FM 4-15, Seacoast Artillery fire control and position finding

See also
Fire lookout tower, used to spot wild fires
Base end station
 Fire-control system
Coast Artillery fire control system
 Coastal defence and fortification
 Seacoast defense in the United States
Flak tower, similar large concrete towers built during WWII for anti-aircraft defense.

Military installations
Coastal artillery
Towers